Black Sheep was an American, Rochester, New York-based, 1970s rock music band, one of vocalist Lou Gramm's early working bands (it followed Poor Heart, which broke up c. 1970). The group, which had released the single "Stick Around" in 1974, the album Black Sheep in 1975, and the album Encouraging Words in late 1975, was no longer performing when Gramm was invited by Mick Jones to join the band Foreigner in 1976. Don Mancuso and Ron Rocco were later members of Cheater, a local hard rock band from Rochester that released a 10-inch record entitled Ten Cent Love Affair in 1980 on Mallard Records.

Black Sheep's bass player Bruce Turgon played on Lou Gramm's solo albums in the late 1980s (which also featured contributions from another Black Sheep alumnus, guitarist Don Mancuso) and joined Gramm in one of Foreigner's later incarnations, in 1992.

Albums

"Black Sheep" (1975) - Capitol Records / Capitol ST-11369
Side One
 "Payin' Yer Dues" - (Lou Grammatico, Don Mancuso, Larry Crozier, Ron Rocco) - 4:08
 "Broken Promises" - (Grammatico, Crozier, Bruce Turgon) - 3:20
 "Woman Back Home" - (Grammatico, Turgon) - 3:20
 "Piano Prelude" - (Crozier) - 1:04
 "Let Me Stay" - (Grammatico, Turgon) - 7:15
Side Two
 "Power To Heal" - (Grammatico, Turgon) - 3:19
 "Far Side Of The Sun" - (Grammatico, Mancuso, Rocco) - 6:56
 "A Little Or A Lot" - (Grammatico, Mancuso, Turgon) - 3:34
 "Freight Train" - (Grammatico, Mancuso, Rocco) - 3:00
 "Woman" - (Paul Rodgers, Andy Fraser) - 8:19 - Cover of the sixth track of Free's self-titled second album

Personnel
 Lou Grammatico - vocals
 Don Mancuso - guitar
 Larry Crozier - keyboards
 Bruce Turgon - bass
 Ron Rocco - drums

"Encouraging Words" (1975) - Capitol Records / Capitol ST-11447
Side One
 "Halfway Home" - (Lou Grammatico, Bruce Turgon) - 4:19
 "Encouraging Words" - (Grammatico, Don Mancuso, Turgon) - 5:27
 "To Whom It May Concern" - (Grammatico, Larry Crozier) - 3:51
 "No Worry, No Pain" - (Grammatico, Turgon) - 4:11
 "When It All Makes Sense" - (Grammatico, Crozier) - 4:24
Side Two
 "The Change" - (Turgon) - 5:13
 "All I Am" - (Turgon) - 3:35
 "Shauna" - (Grammatico, Mancuso) - 3:44
 "Chain On Me" - (Grammatico, Mancuso) - 4:21

Personnel
 Lou Grammatico - vocals
 Don Mancuso - guitar
 Larry Crozier - keyboards
 Bruce Turgon - bass
 Mike Bonafede - drums

References

Rock music groups from New York (state)